In Greek mythology, Cranaechme (Ancient Greek: Κραναίχμην means "rocky point") was an Athenian princess as daughter of King Cranaus and Pedias, the Lacedaemonian daughter of Mynes. She was the sister of Cranae and Atthis.

Notes

References 

 Apollodorus, The Library with an English Translation by Sir James George Frazer, F.B.A., F.R.S. in 2 Volumes, Cambridge, MA, Harvard University Press; London, William Heinemann Ltd. 1921. . Online version at the Perseus Digital Library. Greek text available from the same website.
Graves, Robert, The Greek Myths: The Complete and Definitive Edition. Penguin Books Limited. 2017. 

Princesses in Greek mythology
Attican characters in Greek mythology